West Coast Air was a Canadian scheduled airline operating de Havilland Canada DHC-6 Twin Otter float planes, which was integrated into Harbour Air Seaplanes.

History
Harbour Air Seaplanes of Vancouver acquired West Coast Air and consolidated the two airlines' terminal and services on March 31, 2010. All aircraft were transferred to Harbour Air Seaplanes, the West Coast Air name was dropped and the Harbour Air name painted on all aircraft.

When it operated the company offered flights from downtown Vancouver and the Richmond floatplane base at Vancouver International Airport to Victoria, Nanaimo, Comox, the Sunshine Coast, and Whistler. The company also flew tours and private charters.

Destinations
Destinations in February 2010, operated for Harbour Air Seaplanes:

Comox 
Jervis Inlet (Earl's Cove, Chatterbox Falls)
Nanaimo Harbour Water Aerodrome (Nanaimo)
Sechelt
Vancouver Harbour Water Aerodrome (Vancouver)
Vancouver International Water Aerodrome (Richmond)
Victoria Inner Harbour Airport (Victoria)
Whistler (May to September)

Fleet
In June 2015 the West Coast Air fleet was integrated into Harbour Air and painted in the Harbour Air aircraft livery.

Accidents
Even though the aircraft was being flown above VMC it impacted the water about 25 seconds later in a nose-down, right wing-low attitude. The two crew members and 15 passengers all escaped unharmed and were rescued by local watercraft present in the harbour. The Transportation Safety Board of Canada concluded that "Since most air taxi and commuter operators use their own aircraft rather than a simulator for pilot proficiency training, higher-risk emergency scenarios can only be practiced at altitude and discussed in the classroom. As a result, pilots do not gain the benefit of a realistic experience during training." As a result of this accident the company revised its training programs with "increased emphasis on aircraft handling and emergency procedures in response to loss of power at low altitude and low airspeed."

See also
 List of seaplane operators
 List of defunct airlines of Canada

References

External links

 

1996 establishments in British Columbia
2015 disestablishments in British Columbia
Canadian companies established in 1996
Canadian companies disestablished in 2015
Companies based in Vancouver
Regional airlines of British Columbia
Defunct companies of British Columbia
Defunct airlines of Canada
Defunct seaplane operators
Airlines established in 1996
Airlines disestablished in 2015